Area code 269 is the telephone area code serving the southwest portion of Michigan's Lower Peninsula.

History 
269 was created as a split of area code 616 on July 13, 2002. The 269 area covers roughly the lower third of 616 before the split. Frontier and AT&T are the predominant local telephone carriers.

Service area 
Communities using 269 include Decatur, Dowagiac, Allegan, Battle Creek, Kalamazoo, 
Buchanan, Paw Paw, Portage, Otsego, Plainwell, St. Joseph, Benton Harbor, Marshall, Niles, Three Rivers, Sturgis, South Haven, Berrien Springs, and Bridgman.

See also
List of NANP area codes

References

External links
Planning letter 294, which detailed the plan of 269's creation (PDF file)
List of exchanges from AreaCodeDownload.com, 269 Area Code

Telecommunications-related introductions in 2002
269
269
West Michigan
Central Michigan